Arvi Mägi (born 25 February 1949 in Tartu) is an Estonian actor and theatre director.

In 1971 he graduated from Tallinn Pedagogical Institute with a degree in stage arts. From 1971 until 1989 and from 1993 until 1994, he was an actor at the Rakvere Theatre; from 1989 until 1993, he was also its artistic leader. From 1994 until 2015, he worked at Ugala Theatre in Viljandi. Since 2016, he is engaged at the Kuressaare Town Theatre. Besides stage roles he has also acted on films and in television series.

Awards
 1982: Ants Lauter Prize
 1984: Meritorious Artist of the Estonian SSR

Filmography

 1981: Keskpäev
 2013: Naabriplika
 2013: Hakkab jälle pihta 
 2015: Varjudemaa
 2016: Klassikokkutulek

References

Living people
1949 births
Estonian male stage actors
Estonian male film actors
Estonian male television actors
20th-century Estonian male actors
21st-century Estonian male actors
Estonian theatre directors
Tallinn University alumni
Male actors from Tartu